Goibo is a township in Markam County in the Tibet Autonomous Region of China.

See also
List of township-level divisions of the Tibet Autonomous Region

References

Populated places in Chamdo
Township-level divisions of Tibet